Achille Errani (20 August 1823 – 6 January 1897) was an Italian opera singer who also taught that skill in New York City.

Early life
Errani was born in Faenza, Italy.  When seventeen years of age he entered the Milan Conservatory, and studied singing under the famous Vaccai. About five years later he made his first appearance as a leading tenor at Reggio di Modena.

Career
In 1859, after singing often in Italy, Spain, and Greece, he went to Havana under the management of Max Maretzek.  He came to New York City in 1860, sang at the Winter Garden with Fabbri, Gazia, and Frezzolini, and in 1861, when Adelina Patti sang Violetta in Traviata for the first time, he took the part of Alfredo. He went to Mexico in 1863, and after the Civil War made a tour through the southern United States as first tenor of an opera company. He then settled in New York as a teacher of the Italian style of singing.

His most famous pupils were Minnie Hauk, Miss Thursby, Mme. Durand, Nancy McIntosh, Stella Bonheur, Caroline Keating Reed, and Cornelia Townsend.

Death
Errani died on 6 January 1897, aged 73, in New York City.

References

1823 births
1897 deaths
19th-century American male opera singers
Singers from New York City
Italian emigrants to the United States
People from Faenza
19th-century Italian male opera singers
Milan Conservatory alumni
Educators from New York City
Classical musicians from New York (state)
19th-century American educators